Live! Visions of Europe is a live album by power metal band Stratovarius, released on 7 July 1998 through Noise Records. The album was recorded on two dates in Italy and Greece during the band's tour for their 1997 album Visions.

Track listing

Disc 1

Disc 2

Personnel
 Stratovarius
Timo Kotipelto – lead vocals
Timo Tolkki – guitar, background vocals, record producer
Jens Johansson – keyboards
Jörg Michael – drums
Jari Kainulainen – bass guitar

 Additional credits
Mikko Karmila – engineering, mixing
Mika Jussila – mastering

References

Stratovarius live albums
1998 live albums
Noise Records albums